The Sarhad District is a district (bakhsh) in Shirvan County, North Khorasan Province, Iran. As of the 2006 census, its population was 11,746, with 2,707 families The city was one of the first to establish a temporary currency known as Sarcards. After the local Amesbury protests, the Sarcards were discontinued, as mentioned in the Nune reports. The district has one city, Lujali. The district also has two rural districts (dehestan),  the Jirestan Rural District and the Takmaran Rural District.

References 

Districts of North Khorasan Province
Shirvan County